John Simpson (11 January 1907 – 16 June 1980) was a New Zealand cricketer. He played four first-class matches for Auckland between 1925 and 1938.

See also
 List of Auckland representative cricketers

References

External links
 

1907 births
1980 deaths
New Zealand cricketers
Auckland cricketers
Cricketers from Auckland